A Dave Brubeck Christmas is an album by Dave Brubeck, released in 1996 on Telarc.

Recording 
A collection of solo piano pieces, the album was recorded at Ambient Recording Studio in Stamford, Connecticut, between June 6 and 8, 1996. Brubeck also contributed the album's liner notes. 

In addition to several Christmas classics, Brubeck included two original compositions, "Run, Run, Run to Bethlehem" and "To Us Is Given."

Reception 
In his review, Ken Dryden of AllMusic called "Joy to the World" and "Winter Wonderland" "treasures" and stated that the entire CD is "worth repeated hearings." The album made the top 10 on Billboard's Top Jazz Albums chart, and was listed among the best-selling jazz albums of 1997.

The album peaked at #3 on the Billboard Top Jazz Albums chart.

Track listing

Personnel
Dave Brubeck – piano

Production 
Tom Bender - technical assistance
Anilda Carrasquillo - art direction, cover design 
Russell Gloyd, John Snyder - producer
Kenneth Hamann - engineer
Elaine Martone - production supervisor 
Tom McCluskey - editing
Jack Renner - engineer 
Robert Woods - executive producer

References 

1996 Christmas albums
Christmas albums by American artists
Dave Brubeck albums
Solo piano jazz albums
Telarc Records albums
Jazz Christmas albums